Christina Jutterström (born 27 March 1940) is a Swedish journalist, former chief editor for Dagens Nyheter between 1982 and 1995 and for Expressen between 1995 and 1996. In 2001 Jutterström was appointed the CEO post at public broadcaster Sveriges Television, a post she held until 2006. Jutterström was married to Ingemar Odlander from 1978 until his death in 2014.

References 

Swedish journalists
Living people
1940 births
Swedish chief executives
Swedish television executives
Swedish women business executives
Sveriges Television
Journalists from Stockholm
Dagens Nyheter editors
20th-century Swedish women
21st-century Swedish women